Gishan Dissanaike is a financial economist and holds the Adam Smith Professorial Chair in Corporate Governance at the University of Cambridge. He was, until recently, the Head of the Finance & Accounting Subject Group at Cambridge University’s Judge Business School.  He was also the Director of the Cambridge MPhil Programme in Finance, a cross-faculty programme involving three faculties - the Faculty of Economics, Faculty of Mathematics and Cambridge Judge Business School. He is the son of George Dissanaike.

Education
Dissanaike had his schooling at Trinity College, Kandy, where he was awarded the Ryde Gold Medal. He completed his undergraduate education at the University of Peradeniya, and obtained a First Class Honours degree in Economics. A First in monetary economics was awarded by the University after an 18-year gap. Gishan also won the P.D. Khan Gold Medal for the best performance in Economics and the Arts Faculty Scholarship for the best performance in the faculty.

He then went up to Trinity College, Cambridge, and obtained his MPhil and PhD in Economics from the University of Cambridge. He won an External Research Studentship for Economics, awarded by Trinity College, Cambridge, and an Overseas Research Studentship, awarded by the Committee of Vice-chancellors and Principals of the Universities of the UK.

References

External links
Faculty page

Living people
Professors of the University of Cambridge
Alumni of Trinity College, Cambridge
Alumni of the University of Peradeniya
Sri Lankan economists
Sinhalese academics
Alumni of Trinity College, Kandy
Year of birth missing (living people)